Chalk Mountain may refer to:

Chalk Mountain (Churchill County, Nevada), a summit
Chalk Mountain, Texas, an unincorporated community

See also
Chalk Mountains (disambiguation)